Frank Cappelli (August 17, 1952 – March 6, 2018) was the star of the children's television series Cappelli & Company. He was also a solo singer and recording artist with six releases on the A & M label.

Cappelli was born in Utica, New York, and raised from age four in Mt. Lebanon Township, Pennsylvania.

Cappelli died of a heart attack at age 65 on March 6, 2018.

References

1952 births
2018 deaths
American male television actors
Musicians from Utica, New York
American male singers